Agnes of Hesse (31 May 1527 – 4 November 1555) was a princess of Hesse by birth and by marriage Electress of Saxony.

Life 
Agnes was a daughter of Philip I, Landgrave of Hesse, and his first wife, Christine of Saxony.  She married Maurice, Duke (and later Elector) of Saxony, on 9 January 1541.  From this marriage, she had two children: Anna of Saxony (23 December 1544 – 18 December 1577) and Albert (28 November 1545 – 12 April 1546).  The marriage between the two was not arranged by their parents but was initiated by Maurice and Agnes themselves, which at the time was highly unusual.  Their surviving letters document the continuing friendship and mutual trust between the spouses.  Agnes was also informed about the political plans of her husband. After her mother Christine's death in 1549, she took on the education of her younger siblings.  Elector Maurice died on 9 July 1553 from his injuries in the Battle of Sievershausen.

On 26 May 1555, Agnes married her second husband, John Frederick II, Duke of Saxony.  She was already of poor health at the time, and died six months later from a miscarriage.  In the choir of the church St. Peter und Paul in Weimar, however, an unknown author states her death was due to poisoning.  We can only speculate about the actual cause of her death.  The fact that Agnes of Hesse had married into a rival family is consistent with the murder theory: members of the Albertine branch of the House of Wettin may have suspected her of revealing state secrets to the rival Ernestine branch.

References  
 Political correspondence of the Duke and Elector Maurice of Saxony, 6 vols, Berlin 1902-2006

Footnotes 

|-

|-

|-

House of Hesse
House of Wettin
1527 births
1555 deaths
Electresses of Saxony
⚭Agnes of Hesse
Deaths in childbirth
Daughters of monarchs
Remarried royal consorts